Andrea Anders (born May 10, 1975) is an American actress. She is best known for her work on television, notably through her main roles on five anticipated but short-lived sitcoms, Joey, The Class, Better Off Ted, Mr. Sunshine and Mr. Mom, as well as recurring and guest roles on numerous TV series including Cruel Summer, Oz, Young Sheldon, Modern Family, Necessary Roughness, and That '90s Show. Additionally, she has been cast in nearly ten produced but unsold pilots.

In addition, she regularly appears as supporting characters in films directed or produced by her older brother Sean Anders, namely Never Been Thawed, Sex Drive, Daddy's Home 2, Instant Family, Countdown and Spirited, and has also had roles in a handful of other films such as The Stepford Wives, Return to Zero, Is That a Gun in Your Pocket? and Nancy Drew and the Hidden Staircase.

Early life
Andrea Anders was born in Madison, Wisconsin on May 10, 1975, the third child of Terrance and Sally Anders. She was raised in DeForest, Wisconsin with her sister Torri and her brother Sean, where she attended the DeForest Area High School, graduating  in 1993. She went on to study acting at the University of Wisconsin–Stevens Point, receiving her bachelor's degree in fine arts in 1997. She then moved to New Jersey to study at Rutgers University's Mason Gross School of the Arts, earning a Master of Fine Arts in 2001. In addition, she trained in the Meisner technique under Maggie Flanigan and credits the teacher with her continued work as an actress.

Career

Theatre
In 2001, Anders began her career in theatre. She was an understudy for Mary-Louise Parker in the Broadway production of Proof and later played the part of Elaine Robinson in The Graduate. She also appeared in On the Jump at the Arena Stage, New Doors at the Guthrie Theater, Debbie Does Dallas: The Musical and two New York Stage & Film productions: Cold/Tender and New World Rhapsody.

In May 2007, Anders started in the Geffen Playhouse performance of Fat Pig. She played the part of Jeannie, an accountant. Fat Pig closed on July 1, 2007.

Television and film
One of Anders' first appearances on television was a commercial for Danone that ran in the 1990s and then again around 2006.

Her first acting credits came between 1998 and 2001 when she appeared on the soap operas One Life to Live and Guiding Light, respectively as Elaine, one of Starr Manning's nannies, and Ellie, an assistant to Olivia Spencer.

In 2001, she appeared in the Law & Order episode "The Fire This Time", as teenager Emily Hoyt. In 2003, she played the recurring role of Donna Degenhart for five episodes of the HBO drama series Oz. That same year, Anders was cast opposite Richard Ruccolo as the original female lead in the failed television pilot for the proposed series Spellbound, about a warlock who falls in love with a mortal woman. After the pilot was not picked up by NBC, Anders was replaced for the equally unsuccessful second pilot.

In 2004, Anders made her film debut with a minor role in The Stepford Wives, playing a secretary to Nicole Kidman's main character. That same year, she was cast as Emma Leeds, the female lead in News To Me, a proposed workplace sitcom inspired by Joel Stein's experiences as the youngest-ever columnist at Time magazine; the pilot was not picked up. That same year, Anders guest starred in one episode of the series Tru Calling.

In July 2004, Anders was cast in what would be her breakthrough role as Alex Garrett, Joey Tribbiani's neighbor, landlady, friend and eventual love interest on the Friends spin-off, Joey. NBC cancelled the series during its second season.

In between seasons of Joey, Anders appeared as a "Christian Band Slut" in her older brother Sean's directorial debut film Never Been Thawed, marking the first of many collaborations between the pair.

In February 2006, prior to Joeys cancellation, Anders signed as a series regular of the sitcom The Class as Nicole, the unfulfilled wife of a former pro-football player who reconnects with her high school boyfriend after a class reunion. Despite steady ratings and winning the Favorite New TV Comedy Award at the 33rd People's Choice Awards, CBS did not renew the show for a second season.

In 2008, following The Class''' cancelation, Anders guest starred on the episode "Power" of the crime drama Numb3rs, and had a small role her brother's film, Sex Drive.

In May 2008, Anders was cast in the satirical workplace comedy Better Off Ted, after creator Victor Fresco was impressed with her work on The Class. She played Linda Zwordling, the love interest for main character Ted Crisp, played by Jay Harrington, and a co-worker of his at an evil megacorporation. The series was a mid-season replacement, premiering to low rating in March 2009, but critical acclaim kept the show going and even renewed for a second season, though it would be cancelled and pulled from the air with the last two episodes of that season unaired. The show enjoyed a mini-reunion in 2011 through the music video for Revenge of the Nerds, a rap song recorded by co-star Malcolm Barrett under the stage name "Verbal", which features all the main actors from the series in cameos either as their characters or, in the case of Anders, new characters.

In April 2009, shortly after Better Off Ted premiered, Anders joined the cast of The Big D, a sitcom project centered on a New York City coupleplayed by Anders and Ben Koldykewho move to Dallas, where the husband is from, and where the wife consistently clashes with her southern belle mother-in-law. Despite her character being central to the premise, Anders was billed as a guest star in case she'd have to work on The Big D and Better Off Ted at the same time, with the latter having precedence. This issue was moot, as CBS did not pick up the series.

In February 2010, Anders was cast in Mr. Sunshine, marking the return to comedy television for Friends star Matthew Perry. Anders played Alice, the tomboyish co-worker and friend with benefits who's looking for more commitment from Perry's character. It premiered as a midseason replacement the following February, but was cancelled by ABC just three months.

Right after Mr. Sunshines cancellation, Anders appeared in a four episode story arc in the first season of USA Network's series Necessary Roughness, as a former girlfriend of Marc Blucas' character.

In the years following Mr. Sunshine, Anders starred as a lead in a string of sitcom pilots, none of which were picked up to series. First was Ladyfriends in 2012, for NBC, centered on two best friends leading very different lives, portrayed by Anders and Minnie Driver. In 2013, ABC did not pick up Divorce: A Love Story, an adaptation of the long-running Israeli sitcom Ha-Chaim Ze Lo Hacol, about a happily divorced couple played by Anders and Jason Jones. In 2014, CBS did not pickup the proposed Cuz-Bros, in which Anders was cast as an anchorwoman and co-worker of Geoff Stultss character

In 2015, Anders starred in two more failed pilots. First was How We Live, where Anders played a stay-at-home mom and best friend of the female lead, played by Briga Heelan. Next was The Half of It, where Anders portrayed the ex-wife of Jon Dore's character. In 2016, she starred in the failed pilot for the sitcom Crunch Time, as the creator and producer of a game show hosted by Craig Ferguson's character.

While making pilots for all these failed series attempts, Anders had roles in a number of other projects. In 2012, she filmed a supporting part in the fact-based television film Return to Zero, which premiered on the Lifetime Network in 2014. She had recurring roles in the one season each of comedy series About a Boy and of Modern Family, appearing in the latter as the obnoxious new neighbor of the Dunphy family. In 2016, she was the main character in the comedy film Is That a Gun in Your Pocket?, where women in a small Texas town withhold sex until their partners dispose of their guns. That same year, she also did a guest spot on the first season of Speechless, a sitcom led by Minnie Driver, her co-star from the failed Ladyfriends pilot.

In 2019, she appeared as the aunt of Sophia Lillis' character in the film Nancy Drew and the Hidden Staircase, and as the mother of Elizabeth Lail's character in the film Countdown, the latter produced by her brother Sean. That same year, Anders played the starring role in the sitcom Mr. Mom, which was cancelled after 11 episodes.

Personal life
Andrea Anders met actor Matt LeBlanc in 2004 while co-starring as his friend and eventual love interest on Joey'' and the pair eventually embarked on a relationship which was confirmed in 2006 following LeBlanc's split from his wife  Melissa McKnight. After over eight years as a couple, LeBlanc announced at the start of 2015 that he and Anders had been broken up for several months.

In late 2016, Anders revealed she was pregnant, talking about the experience at length during a stand-up comedy set on December 15, 2016. She has however never publicly discussed the child's birth, gender, name or father, stating only that the pregnancy was unplanned.

On September 15, 2016, Andrea and her older brother Sean Anders were inducted into their high school's hall of fame, at the DeForest Area High School's Performing Arts Center,

Filmography

References

External links
 
 

20th-century American actresses
21st-century American actresses
Actors from Madison, Wisconsin
Actresses from Wisconsin
American film actresses
American television actresses
Living people
People from DeForest, Wisconsin
Rutgers University alumni
University of Wisconsin–Stevens Point alumni
1975 births